Jiří Veselý was the defending champion, but lost in the first round to Roberto Bautista Agut.
Bautista Agut went on to win the title, defeating Jack Sock in the final, 6–1, 1–0, ret.

Seeds
The top four seeds received a bye into the second round.

Draw

Finals

Top half

Bottom half

Qualifying

Seeds

Qualifiers

Qualifying draw

First qualifier

Second qualifier

Third qualifier

Fourth qualifier

References
 Main Draw
 Qualifying Draw

2016 Singles
ASB Classic - Doubles
ASB Classic - Men's Doubles